Demodex leucogasteri is a hair follicle mite found in the hair follicles of the grasshopper mouse, Onychomys leucogaster.

The mites were found on laboratory maintained individuals of the grasshopper mouse.

References

Trombidiformes
Animals described in 1981